Pakari or Pakri (पकड़ी) is a small village in the Ghazipur district of India. It is near the village of Reotipur. In the older colonial spelling it is mentioned as Puckry. There are other places called Pakri in India. Pakari village is located 10 (approx)  km towards East from District headquarters Ghazipur on the UP State Highway No. 99 (SH-99) between villages Derhgawan and Reotipur, 366 km from State capital Lucknow

Pakari Pin code is 232328 and postal head office is Reotipur. Ghazipur, Zamania, Ballia, Rasra are the nearby Cities to Pakari. It is located at the border of the Ghazipur District and Buxar District (Bihar).

Villages in Ghazipur district